The 1910–11 season was the 16th season of competitive football in Belgium.

Overview
CS Brugeois claimed their first ever silverware by winning the Division I. SC Courtraisien finished 12th and last of the first division and was relegated to the promotion, and replaced by promotion winner RC de Gand.

National team

* Belgium score given first

Key
 H = Home match
 A = Away match
 N = On neutral ground
 F = Friendly
 o.g. = own goal

Honours

Final league tables

Division I

Promotion

References
RSSSF archive - Final tables 1895-2002
Belgian clubs history
Belgium Soccer History